Llangybi was a railway station located some distance from Llangybi, Gwynedd, Wales.

The station was isolated and lightly used, but it had two platforms and remained open until the line closed because it was a crossing place where the otherwise single track route became twin track for a short distance.

The line and station were closed in December 1964.

References

Sources

Further material

External links
 The station site on a navigable OS Map, via National Library of Scotland
 The station and line, via Rail Map Online
 The line CNV with mileages, via Railway Codes
 Images of the station, via Yahoo
 The station and line, via LNWR Society
 By DMU from Pwllheli to Amlwch, via Huntley Archives

Beeching closures in Wales
Disused railway stations in Gwynedd
Llanystumdwy
Former London and North Western Railway stations
Railway stations in Great Britain opened in 1869
Railway stations in Great Britain closed in 1964